The birds and the bees is an idiom that refers to courtship and sex.

The Birds and the Bees may also refer to:

Film and television 
 The Birds and the Bees (film), a 1956 remake of The Lady Eve
 "The Birds and the Bees", an episode of Diff'rent Strokes

Music 
 The Birds and the Bees (EP), a split EP by Trial Kennedy and Horsell Common
 "The Birds and the Bees" (Jewel Akens song)
 "(The Same Thing Happens with) The Birds and the Bees", a song from the film The Birds and the Bees
 "The Birds and the Bees", a song by Breathe Carolina from Gossip
 "The Birds and the Bees", a song by Patrick & Eugene from Postcard from Summerisle
 "The Birds and the Bees", a song by The Real Tuesday Weld from The Return of the Clerkenwell Kid
 "Birds and Bees", a song by Warm Sounds
 "Birds & Bees", a song by Carly Rose Sonenclar

See also 
 The Bird and the Bee, an American indie musical duo
 The Bird and the Bee (album), the eponymous debut album by The Bird and the Bee
 The Birds & the B-Sides, an album by Shonen Knife
 The Bird and the Bee Sides, a double EP by Relient K